The list of ship decommissionings in 1956 includes a chronological list of all ships decommissioned in 1956.


See also 

1956
 Ship decommissionings
Ship